Jan Wiktor Wiśniewski (1 May 1922 – 10 March 2006) was a Polish footballer who competed in the 1952 Summer Olympics.

References

1922 births
2006 deaths
Association football forwards
Polish footballers
Olympic footballers of Poland
Footballers at the 1952 Summer Olympics
Polonia Bytom players
Poland international footballers
People from Ringsted